Christian Democratic and Flemish (CD&V) is a Flemish Christian-democratic political party in Belgium. The party has historical ties to both trade unionism (ACV) and trade associations (UNIZO) and the Farmer's League. Until 2001, the party was named the Christian People's Party (Christelijke Volkspartij, CVP).

It was traditionally the largest political party of Flanders, until it was overtaken by the New Flemish Alliance (N-VA) in the 2010s. CD&V participated in most governments and has generally the largest number of mayors. Most Prime Ministers of Belgium and Ministers-President of Flanders have been CD&V politicians. Herman Van Rompuy, the president of the European Council from 2009 to 2014, is one of the leading politicians of CD&V.

CD&V is a member of the European People's Party (EPP) and Centrist Democrat International.

History
The history of the CD&V dates back to the 19th century. It originated in the 19th century Catholic Party. At the end of the century, the new fraction of Christian democrats shifted the focus of the party slightly to the left. In the interwar years the party was renamed Catholic Bloc. Then, the Christian Social Party (PSC-CVP) existed from 1945 until 1968. In 1968, the PSC-CVP was split into the French-speaking Christian Social Party (PSC, now Humanist Democratic Centre, cdH) and Flemish Christian People's Party (Christelijke Volkspartij CVP). In 2001 the CVP changed its name to the CD&V.

The party was almost continually in power from its establishment until 1999, with the exception of 1954–1958. In 1999, the Flemish Liberals and Democrats (VLD) became the largest party in Belgium, and formed a  majority purple government of liberals, social democrats and greens. The same happened in the Flemish Government, but with the addition of Flemish nationalists. In 2003 CD&V again lost the federal elections which continued the federal centre-left coalition, but this time without the Greens.

In 2004, Flemish elections were held and the CD&V once more became the largest political party by representation in the Flemish Parliament. Yves Leterme became Flemish minister-president. After successful local elections in 2006, the party became the largest party in the Belgian Chamber of Representatives after the federal elections of 2007. The CD&V led the subsequent coalition talks, which repeatedly stalled (see 2007–2008 Belgian government formation). On the 20 March 2008, a new federal government was finally assembled, led by Yves Leterme. Kris Peeters subsequently became the next minister-president of Flanders. From 30 December 2008 till 25 November 2009, Herman Van Rompuy led his first cabinet before becoming the first permanent president of the European Council. Afterwards, Yves Leterme led his second government.

In June 2009, Flemish elections were held and the CD&V remained the largest party of Flanders. Kris Peeters stayed as Flemish minister-president. The party also remained the largest Flemish party in the European Parliament after the 2009 European elections.

In 2010, the Open Flemish Liberals and Democrats (Open VLD) decided to step out of the federal coalition, consequently ending the government. The federal elections of 2010 resulted in a major loss of historic proportions for CD&V, largely due to votes lost to the Flemish-nationalist New Flemish Alliance. In the campaign, former prime minister Yves Leterme took a subtle step aside as frontrunner of the party. The president of the party, Marianne Thyssen, had pre-electorally stated that she was a candidate to become Prime Minister.

On 6 December 2011, the Di Rupo Government was formed, with the CD&V as the largest Flemish party.

During the local elections in 2012, CD&V managed to remain the largest Flemish party on the local level. It remained in the coalition of all five Flemish provinces and in three quarters of the municipalities. Almost half of these municipalities were subsequently led by CD&V mayors.

Ideology
CD&V follows the principle of Christian democracy and describes itself as a broad movement that bases its ideology on "solidarity and justice." It describes its core philosophy as ensuring socio-economic policies made by government create a good quality of life for Flemish citizens through investing in cultural education and maintaining the family unit. CD&V also supports stricter penalties for sexual crimes and opposes legalization of hard drugs. The party also supports reform of the Belgian state by giving visibility to Flemish voters and creating a unified police zone in Brussels.

Members holding notable public offices

European politics

Federal politics

Regional politics

Electoral results

Chamber of Representatives 
Results for the Chamber of Representatives, in percentages for the Kingdom of Belgium. From 1971 tot 1999: CVP figures. 2003: CD&V figures. 2007: CD&V/N-VA figures. From 2010 onwards: CD&V figures.

Senate

Regional

Brussels Parliament

Flemish Parliament

Provincial

European Parliament

Presidents
CVP/PSC
1945–1947 Gilbert Mullie
1947–1949 Paul Willem Segers
1949–1959 Jef De Schuyffeleer
1959–1961 Fred Bertrand
1961–1963 Jozef De Saeger
1963–1968 Robert Vandekerckhove

CVP
1968–1972 Robert Vandekerckhove
1972–1979 Wilfried Martens
1979–1982 Leo Tindemans
1982–1988 Frank Swaelen
1988–1993 Herman Van Rompuy
1993–1996 Johan Van Hecke
1996–1999 Marc Van Peel
1999–2001 Stefaan De Clerck

CD&V
2001–2003 Stefaan De Clerck
2003–2004 Yves Leterme
2004–2007 Jo Vandeurzen
2007–2008 Etienne Schouppe
2008–2008 Wouter Beke
2008–2010 Marianne Thyssen
2010–2019 Wouter Beke
2019 Cindy Franssen & Griet Smaers (ad interim)
2019–2022 Joachim Coens
2022– Sammy Mahdi

Until 1968 this lists gives the president of the Flemish part of the unitary CVP/PSC.
The party changed its name from CVP to CD&V on 29 September 2001.

See also
 Christene Volkspartij
 Graves de communi re

Notes

References
 Th. Luykx and M. Platel, Politieke geschiedenis van België, 2 vol., Kluwer, 1985
 W. Dewachter, Tussen staat en maatschappij, 1945–1995, christendemocratie in België, Tielt, 1995.
 E. Witte, J. Craeybeckx en A. Meynen, Politieke geschiedenis van België, Standaard, 1997

Further reading

External links
 Official website
 CD&V page on the website of the European People's Party

Christian democratic parties in Belgium
Flemish political parties in Belgium
Political parties established in 1968
1968 establishments in Belgium
Member parties of the European People's Party